Keynot Peak is an  mountain in the Inyo Mountains of Inyo County, California U.S. The summit is the highest point in the Inyo Mountains Wilderness Area which is administered by the Bureau of Land Management. It is located east of the Owens Valley and U.S. Route 395.

References

Inyo Mountains
Mountains of Inyo County, California
Mountains of Northern California
North American 3000 m summits